Qılıçlı or Klychly may refer to:
Qılıçlı, Kalbajar, Azerbaijan
Qılıçlı, Lachin, Azerbaijan

See also
 Qılınclı (disambiguation)
 Kılıçlı (disambiguation)